Settimio Todisco (born 10 May 1924) is an Italian prelate in the Roman Catholic Church.

Todisco was born in Brindisi and ordained a priest on 27 July 1947. Todisco was appointed Apostolic Administrator of the Diocese of Molfetta-Ruvo-Giovinazzo-Terlizzi, as well as titular bishop of Bigastro, on 15 December 1969 and ordained on 15 February 1970. Todisco was appointed bishop to the Diocese of Brindisi-Ostuni on 24 May 1975 and elevated to archbishop when the diocese changed its name to the Archdiocese of Brindisi-Ostuni in 1986. Todisco retired from archdiocese on 5 February 2000.

See also
Archdiocese of Brindisi-Ostuni

External links
Catholic-Hierarchy
Brindisi-Ostuni Archdiocese 

20th-century Italian Roman Catholic bishops
Roman Catholic archbishops of Brindisi
1924 births
Living people